The 1895 United Counties League was a league based competition between six East Midlands and Sheffield based clubs. The league was not finished as clubs failed to complete their fixtures.

Table
This is the state of the table when the competition folded.

Results

References

United Counties League (1890s)